This is a list of the songs that reached number one in Mexico in 1991, according to the Notitas Musicales magazine with data provided by Radio Mil (which also provided charts for Billboard's "Hits of the World" between 1969 and 1981).

Notitas Musicales was a bi-weekly magazine that published two record charts:

"Canciones que México canta" ("Songs that Mexico sings"), which listed the Top 10 most popular Spanish-language songs in Mexico, and
"Hit Parade", which was a Top 10 of the most popular songs in Mexico that were in languages other than Spanish. For reasons unknown, the magazine stopped publishing the "Hit Parade" chart in 1988 and wouldn't feature it again until 1993.

Chart history

See also
1991 in music

References

Sources
Print editions of the Notitas Musicales magazine.

1991 in Mexico
Mexico
Lists of number-one songs in Mexico